Everest Bank Limited is the Commercial Bank of Nepal. Which is joint venture of Punjab National Bank, India which  holds 20% equity shares of Bank. It is the first Nepalese Bank which has Representative Office in India. The bank has a wide network of 124 branches,160 ATM Counters, 32 Revenue collection counters and 3 Extension counters and many correspondents across the globe.

The Board of Everest Bank Ltd. appointed Mr. Sudesh Khaling as the first Nepali Chief Executive Officer CEO in its 25-year journey. Earlier, the bank had been appointing only Indian nationals as the CEO of the bank.

External links
 Official Website

References

Economy of Nepal
Banks of Nepal
1994 establishments in Nepal